Leake Mounds (9BR2) is an important archaeological site in Bartow County, Georgia built and used by peoples of the Swift Creek Culture. It predates that site by hundreds of years. 

It was a center with ties throughout the Southeast and Midwest. It was abandoned about 650 CE. It was not occupied again for nearly nine hundred years, until about 1500, by different peoples near the end of the Mississippian culture period.

The site includes at least three major platform mounds and a large semi-circular moat/ditch. While much of the mounds were razed to be used as road fill for the expansion of the Georgia State Route 113 and Georgia State Route 61 in the 1940s, significant portions of the site remain. Several sites on nearby Ladds Mountain were integrally associated with Leake, including Shaw Mound, a stone burial mound; Indian Fort, a stone wall enclosure; and Ladds Cave, a large cave.

Examples of a type of pottery decoration consisting of a diamond-shaped checks found at Leake Mounds are also known from Hopewell sites in Ohio (such as Seip, Rockhold, Harness, and Turner), the Mann site in southern Indiana. This style has also been found on pottery at other sites in the South, such as the Miner's Creek site, 9HY98, and Mandeville site in Georgia, and the Yearwood site in southern Tennessee.

See also
 Etowah Indian Mounds (9BR1)
 King Archaeological Site
 List of burial mounds in the United States
 List of Hopewell sites

References

External links
 Excavation and Archaeological Investigation at Bartow County's Leake Site
 Bartow County Georgia Profile and Information Guide
 The Woodland Period Cultural Landscape of the Leake Site Complex: Encompassing the Diversity of Human Action
 THE MANN SITE AND THE LEAKE SITE : LINKING THE MIDWEST AND THE SOUTHEAST DURING THE MIDDLE WOODLAND PERIOD

Swift Creek culture
South Appalachian Mississippian culture
Archaeological sites in Georgia (U.S. state)
Geography of Bartow County, Georgia
Mounds in Georgia (U.S. state)